Stefaan Vaes (born February 29, 1976 in Herentals, Belgium) is a Belgian mathematician.

Vaes studied mathematics at the KU Leuven with a diploma in 1998 and a PhD in 2001 with thesis advisor Alfons Van Daele and thesis Locally Compact Quantum Groups. As a postdoc he was from 1998 to 2002 at KU Leuven and from 1998 to 2002 in Paris, where he did research for CNRS. In 2002 he began part-time teaching at the KU Leuven, where he became an associate professor in 2006 and a full professor in 2009.

He was a visiting professor in 2009 at Pierre and Marie Curie University (Paris VI) and in 2011 at Paris Diderot University (Paris VII) (where he habilitated in 2004). In 2005 he held the Peccot Chair at the Collège de France.

His research deals with Von Neumann algebras and quantum groups.

In 2010, Vaes was an Invited Speaker with talk Rigidity for von Neumann algebras and their invariants at the International Congress of Mathematicians in Hyderabad. In 2012 he was elected a Fellow of the American Mathematical Society. In 2015 he received the Francqui Prize.

His doctoral students include Cyril Houdayer.

Selected references
 with Johan Kustermans: Locally Compact Quantum Groups, Annales Scientifiques de l'École Normale Supérieure, vol. 33, 2000, pp. 837–934
 with J. Kustermans: Locally compact quantum groups in the von Neumann algebraic setting, Mathematica Scandinavica, Vol. 92, 2003, pp. 68–92
 with J. Kustermans: The operator algebra approach to quantum groups, Proc. Natl. Acad. Sci. USA, Vol. 97, 2000, 547–552
 with Adrian Ioana and Sorin Popa: A class of superrigid group by Neumann algebras, Annals of Mathematics, Vol. 178, 2013, pp. 231–286
 with Sorin Popa: Group measure space decomposition of  factors and W*-superrigidity, Inventiones Mathematicae, Vol. 182, 2010, pp. 371–417.

See also
Locally compact quantum group

References

External links

20th-century Belgian mathematicians
21st-century Belgian mathematicians
KU Leuven alumni
Academic staff of KU Leuven
Fellows of the American Mathematical Society
1976 births
Living people